SIDS most often refers to sudden infant death syndrome, the sudden unexplained death of a child of less than one year of age.

SIDS may also refer to:

 Screening information dataset, a study of the hazards associated with a particular chemical substance
 Small Island Developing States, a group of developing small-island countries

See also
 SID (disambiguation)